Brachytarsophrys intermedia (common name: Annam spadefoot toad) is a species of frog in the family Megophryidae.
It is found in the Central Highlands of southern Vietnam, Laos, and possibly Cambodia. This species might be a synonym of Brachytarsophrys carinense.

Its natural habitats are tropical forests. It is threatened by habitat loss caused by clear cutting and human settlement.

References

intermedia
Amphibians of Laos
Amphibians of Vietnam
Amphibians described in 1921
Taxa named by Malcolm Arthur Smith
Taxonomy articles created by Polbot
Taxobox binomials not recognized by IUCN